A crystallophone is a musical instrument that produces sound from glass.

One of the best known crystallophones is the glass harmonica, a set of rotating glass bowls which produce eerie, clear tones when rubbed with a wet finger. Musical glasses, the glass harp, were documented in Persia in the 14th century.

The glasschord (or glasscord) resembles the celesta (a struck plaque idiophone operated by a keyboard) but uses keyboard-driven hammers to strike glass bars instead of metal bars.

The glass marimba is similar to the marimba (a stick percussion instrument with a keyboard layout), but has bars of glass instead of wood. The bars, which the performer strikes with padded sticks, are perched on a glass box to provide the necessary resonance.

A rare Thai instrument called  (literally "glass xylophone") has been used by the Thai music ensemble Fong Naam; it appears on their 1992 CD The Sleeping Angel:  Thai Classical Music.

In popular culture 
In Lydia Syson's biography, Doctor of Love: James Graham and his Celestial Bed, sexologist James Graham uses the glass harmonica for musical therapy purposes.

Benjamin Franklin was inspired to create his glass harmonica in 1763 after attending a recital performed on musical glasses in London in 1761.

See also
Lithophone
Verrophone

References

External links

Glass music
Oddmusic - a website dedicated to unique, odd, ethnic, experimental and unusual musical instruments and resources.